The 2018–19 season was Olympiacos's 60th consecutive season in the Super League Greece and their 93nd year in existence. They also participated in the Greek Football Cup, where they reached the quarter-finals, and in the UEFA Europa League, where they reached the round of 32. For the second consecutive season, Olympiacos did not win any competition. This was their first consecutive trophyless seasons since 1994–95 to 1995–96.

Players

First team

Out on loan

Transfers and loans

Backroom staff

Competitions

Overview

References

External links 
 Official Website of Olympiacos Piraeus 

Olympiacos F.C. seasons
Olympiacos
Olympiacos F.C.